Fenderesk-e Jonubi Rural District is a rural district (dehestan) in Fenderesk District, Ramian County, Golestan Province, Iran. At the 2006 census, its population was 16,715, in 3,893 families.  The rural district has 14 villages.

References 

Rural Districts of Golestan Province
Ramian County